The year 1668 in science and technology involved some significant events.

Astronomy
 Isaac Newton invents the reflecting telescope.

Biology
 Francesco Redi publishes Esperienze Intorno alla Generazione degl'Insetti ("Experiments on the Generation of Insects"), disproving theories of the spontaneous generation of maggots in putrefying matter.

Mathematics
 Nicholas Mercator and William Brouncker discover an infinite series for the logarithm while attempting to calculate the area under a hyperbolic segment.

Medicine
 François Mauriceau publishes Traité des Maladies des Femmes Grosses et Accouchées in Paris, a key text in scientific obstetrics.
 John Mayow publishes a tract on respiration in Oxford, recognising "spiritus nitro-aereus" as a component of air, prefiguring the isolation of oxygen.

Publications
 John Wilkins publishes An Essay towards a Real Character and a Philosophical Language proposing a universal language and a uniform system of measurement for international communication between natural philosophers.

Births
 December 31 – Herman Boerhaave, Dutch physician and chemist who makes Leiden a European centre of medical knowledge (died 1738)

Deaths

References

 
17th century in science
1660s in science